The 2018 Kentucky Bank Tennis Championships was a professional tennis tournament played on outdoor hard courts. It was the twenty-third (ATP) and twenty-first (ITF) editions of the tournament and was part of the 2018 ATP Challenger Tour and the 2018 ITF Women's Circuit. It took place in Lexington, United States, on 30 July–5 August 2018.

Men's singles main draw entrants

Seeds 

 1 Rankings as of 23 July 2018.

Other entrants 
The following players received a wildcard into the singles main draw:
  Collin Altamirano
  William Bushamuka
  Tom Jomby
  Sam Riffice

The following players received entry into the singles main draw as alternates:
  Andrew Harris
  Dayne Kelly

The following players received entry from the qualifying draw:
  Borna Gojo
  Alex Rybakov
  Mikael Torpegaard
  J. J. Wolf

The following player received entry as a lucky loser:
  Ronnie Schneider

Women's singles main draw entrants

Seeds 

 1 Rankings as of 23 July 2018.

Other entrants 
The following players received a wildcard into the singles main draw:
  Jennifer Elie
  Quinn Gleason
  Ann Li
  Peyton Stearns

The following player received entry using a protected ranking:
  Jessica Pegula

The following player received entry by a special exempt:
  Gail Brodsky

The following players received entry from the qualifying draw:
  Alison Bai
  Sanaz Marand
  Anastasia Nefedova
  Kennedy Shaffer

Champions

Men's singles

 Lloyd Harris def.  Stefano Napolitano 6–4, 6–3.

Women's singles

 Asia Muhammad def.  Ann Li, 7–5, 6–1

Men's doubles

 Robert Galloway /  Roberto Maytín def.  Joris De Loore /  Marc Polmans 6–3, 6–1.

Women's doubles

 Hayley Carter /  Ena Shibahara def.  Sanaz Marand /  Victoria Rodríguez, 6–3, 6–1

External links 
 Official website
 2018 Kentucky Bank Tennis Championships at ITFtennis.com

2018 ITF Women's Circuit
2018 ATP Challenger Tour
2018 in American tennis
Lexington Challenger
Tennis in Kentucky